Adam Long (born 25 April 1991) is a British actor, perhaps best known for his appearance as Lewis Whippey in Happy Valley in 2014. 
He also starred in Spike Island, Vera, Waterloo Road, The Thirteenth Tale, and Act Of Grace. Long is represented by the agency Curtis Brown.

Filmography

Film

Television

Games

References

External links
 

Living people
21st-century British male actors
Place of birth missing (living people)
British male television actors
1991 births